The Fitzpatrick Lecture is given annually at the Royal College of Physicians on a subject related to history of medicine. The lecturer, who must be a fellow of the College, is selected by the president and may be chosen to speak for two years successively. The lectures are supported by funds from the Fitzpatrick Trust which was established in 1901 by Agnes Letitia Fitzpatrick  with a £2,000 donation in memory of her physician husband Thomas Fitzpatrick. Agnes was influenced by her husband’s close friend, Sir Norman Moore, who persuaded her to choose ‘’history of medicine’’ as a subject. Subsequently, Moore was credited with its idea and implementation.

The first two Fitzpatrick lectures were given by Joseph Frank Payne, whose request instigated history of medicine lectures at the Royal Society of Medicine and with whose support Sir William Osler established the History of Medicine Section. He was succeeded by Sir Norman Moore, Leonard Guthrie and Clifford Allbutt and Raymond Crawfurd.

Lecturers

1903-1920

1921-1940

1941-1960

1961-1980

1981-2000

2001 onwards

References 

Annual events in London
British lecture series
Medical lecture series
Royal College of Physicians